Edwin Pollock may refer to:

 Edwin Taylor Pollock (1870–1943), U.S. Navy officer 
 Edwin A. Pollock (1899–1982), U.S. Marine Corps general